Edith Hacon (1875 – 25 August 1952) also known as Rhyllis Llewellyn Hacon, later Mrs "Amaryllis" Robichaud, was a leading Scottish suffragist from Dornoch, a World War One nursing volunteer, as well as an international socialite.

Biography 
Born Edith Catherine Mary Dolores Broadbent, to John Broadbent and Margaret Broadbent née Rayment, in 1875, her parents died when she was a young woman. Edith became a socialite in London in her 20s, working as an artist's model (known as Amaryllis) and high class escort (known as Muriel) and was the mistress of Arthur Symons.  Symons wrote her (partly fantasy) life story in 'The Life of Lucy Newcome', with extracts published in The Savoy, and a poem 'To Muriel: At the Opera' (14 November 1892) published in his collection London Nights. Her social circle included Oscar Wilde, Aubrey Beardsley, Selwyn Image, Herbert Horne and international visitors, such as Paul Verlaine. She married barrister and art collector, and investor in the Vale Press, William Llewellyn Hacon and became known as Rhyllis Llewellyn Hacon and converted to Roman Catholicism. 

Due to her husband's interest in golf, they built a home in Dornoch, Sutherland called Oversteps an Arts and Crafts style house (now a nursing home) which Edith later shared with fellow suffragist Margaret Davidson, a teacher, both of whom volunteered to serve in the WW1 women's hospital (to 1917) and became Girl Guide leaders (1931).

Hacon and Davidson took part in the 1928 tercentary Dornoch Pageant marking the granting of the Royal charter to the Burgh of Dornoch by Charles I in 1628.

The Llewellyn Hacons also had a home in Dieppe where they hosted artist Toulouse Lautrec and artist Charles Conder came to Dornoch and painted Edith's portrait in 1896, 'On the Shore at Dornoch' which is in Aberdeen Art Gallery. Another portrait (entitled 'The lady with the green fan (portrait or Mrs Hacon)' ) was painted by Charles Haslewood Shannon; it hangs in Dublin City Gallery, and was referred to in a poem by W.B. Yeats: called The Municipal Gallery Revisited. 

Prime Minister H.H. Asquith resided at Oversteps on his annual holiday in Scotland in 1912. 

William Llewellyn Hacon died in 1910.

Hacon then did charity work in 1912–13 in Shetland with 'Irish fisher girls' who were supported by the Catholic church in the 'gutting' season travelling with the fishing fleet, including contributing to building a rest home, called 'The White Rest'.

In 1918, Hacon married a Canadian soldier William Robichaud, whom she met serving in the Scottish Women's Hospital in France; he later became a timber merchant.

Hacon died on 28 August 1952 in Glasgow but is buried next to William Llewellyn Hacon in Dornoch.

Suffragist leadership 
In 1912, Hacon was a founding member and president of the Women's Liberal Association at Dornoch, and they hosted a tour of leaders from the Scottish women's organisations, encouraging local support for the women's suffrage cause.

In 1914, Hacon became vice-president of the Dornoch National Union of Women's Suffrage Societies (NUWSS) branch and she was able to report that half of the electors had signed their petition in support of women's suffrage, whilst campaigning at the Northern Burghs by-election that year.

The NUWSS membership had grown to 60 members under her leadership and had regular visiting speakers from the national groups.

Role in war nursing service 
At the start of World War One, Hacon volunteered with Margaret Davidson for a role in Dr. Elsie Inglis's WW1 Scottish Women's Hospital at Royaumont and began as an orderly. 'Mrs. Hacon' became the housekeeper and called herself 'Head of Char'. Hacon supervised the kitchen, and seamstress work, making and repairing uniforms and organised hockey matches and tea to keep up morale, and made a rag doll for one of the wounded soldiers. Hacon served for three years, and was awarded a Silver Medal "Medaille des Epidemics" by the French Government, and both the British War Medal and Victory Medal.

As a Roman Catholic, Hacon was not included in the Dornoch Cathedral World War One Roll of Honour plaque as was her friend Margaret Davidson.

References

External links 
 Dornoch history blog – in the picture of Guide leaders, Hacon is sixth from the left
 British World War One Medals

Images 
Kitchen orderlies at Royaumont (shows conditions Hacon worked in)

1875 births
1952 deaths
Scottish Women's Hospitals for Foreign Service volunteers
Dornoch
Girl Guiding and Girl Scouting
Scottish suffragettes
People from Sutherland